Just Let Go is a 2015 American film about a man dealing with the loss of his wife and two children in a traffic crash.

External links

2015 films
American drama films
2015 drama films
2010s American films